Shelby Farms is a public park located  in Shelby County, Tennessee, United States, just east of the city of Memphis.

Lakes, natural forests, and wetlands provide natural habitats for many smaller species close to an urban metropolitan area. Wildlife can be observed in their natural environment from the many trails in the park. Shelby Farms park is home to a bison herd. 

The land Shelby Farm sits atop today was privately-owned property in the 19th century. In 1825, humanist reformer Frances Wright founded the Nashoba Commune on 670 acres north of Wolf River, now part of Shelby Farms Park and Agricenter International. Throughout the 1800s, the commune provided practical and cultural education to emancipated slaves after they worked off the costs of their indentured servitude. Remains of a settlement from the late 19th century are still present in the modern-day park.

From 1929 until 1964, Shelby Farms was used as a penal farm operated by the Shelby County Government.

Shelby Farms was opened for recreational purposes in the 1970s. In 2007, a public and private non-profit partnership was established to provide for the daily operation of the park and to plan for its future use.

In 2008, a masterplan was put in place for the redesign of the park. The re-design provided additional hiking and biking trails as well as more opportunities for boating in a much enlarged Hyde Lake, renamed Patriot Lake.

Geography

It is within the area of East Memphis

Several lakes, natural forests, and the wetlands of the Wolf River are situated in hilly surroundings.

Wildlife
Wildlife, including beavers, deer, turtles, and different species of birds, can be observed in its natural environment. Although the park is surrounded by routes used by commuter traffic, smaller species can still find habitats large enough to survive.

Former Shelby County Mayor Bill Morris was instrumental, along with park superintendent Tom Hill, in introducing the bison, which now number about 45.

History

19th century

In 1825, Frances Wright's Nashoba Experiment was formed on 670 acres of modern-day Shelby Farms park north of Wolf River with the remainder in today's Germantown, Tennessee, south of Wolf River. On  of woodland, humanist reformer Frances Wright, an opponent of slavery, founded a multi-racial commune of slaves, free blacks and whites to prepare slaves and former slaves for their future freedom. Wright believed in the emancipation of slaves by providing education for them in practical and cultural skills.

Remains of an early settlement from the late 19th century can be found at the eastern tip of Shelby Farms park, consisting of ruins of a residential building, a disintegrated barn, car wrecks dating from the 1950s and 1960s, old fences and a family burial site.

In 2005, the family burial site of the Mann family exists with just one grave marker remaining. The last two documented deaths, as indicated on that remaining gravestone, date back to November 25, 1891 for Robert W. Mann and December 5, 1891 for Mary S. Mann. Five or more graves are marked only by their base stones.

Shelby County acquired  of land in 1928 for use as a penal farm.

20th century
From 1929 until 1964, Shelby Farms was used as a penal farm, in which the prisoners of the Shelby County Corrections Center were involved in agricultural labor to provide food for inmates and staff, or to sell overproduction for profit on behalf of the state of Tennessee.

In the 1970s the Shelby County Commission opened the area for recreational purposes.

21st century

The Shelby Farms Park Alliance (SFPA) was granted a conservation easement by the Shelby County Commission in December 2006. The easement restricts commercial and residential development in the park area for 50 years.

In 2007, an agreement was signed between the Shelby County Mayor A.C. Wharton and the SFPA, forming the Shelby Farms Park Conservancy (SFPC), a public and private non-profit partnership established by Shelby County government to help provide day-to-day operations of the park and to develop a planning process for the future of Shelby Farms park.

A masterplan was put in place in 2008 to direct a major re-design of the park. This came to fruition in 2016, when Shelby Farms opened a $52 million expansion that included an enlargement of Patriot Lake (renamed Hyde Lake), the addition of new walking and biking trails, the construction of a new visitors center, and the planting of more than 1 million new trees across the park. In the year after Heart of the Park opened, park staff estimated that visitation to Shelby Farms had more than doubled.

Recreation

Hiking and biking trails meandering through the park allow visitors to observe wildlife and nature. On two lakes rowing boats are allowed. On one of latter two lakes, Patriot Lake, pedal boats can be rented. There is a  paved trail around Patriot Lake. The paved trails are suitable for walking, running, biking, and roller-blading. The Tour de Wolf is suitable for walking, running, and mountain-biking. Off-leash dog activities are designated in a  area that includes meadows, lakes and hiking trails.

The Shelby Farms Greenline is a  multi-use urban rail trail running from Shelby Farms to Tillman Street in the Binghampton neighborhood, near Midtown, Memphis. The trail was constructed over a closed CSX railway line. Shelby Farms Greenline is managed and operated by Shelby Farms Park Conservancy, a nonprofit organization that also manages Shelby Farms park. The Greenline opened in October 2010.  Shelby Farms Greenline is the longest, continuous urban trail in the Memphis area. It is also the first trail in Tennessee to use a pedestrian hybrid beacon at two major crossings: Highland and Graham.

Horseback riding is allowed in parts of the park and on a few trails. Horses can be rented as well. A designated runway to start and land miniature radio-controlled aircraft is present in the park for public use.

An 18-hole disc golf course is located near the welcome center of the park.

A BMX race track sanctioned by USA BMX is located at 6435 Walnut Grove Rd.

See also
 Nashoba Commune
 Frances Wright

References

External links
 Maps of trails in Shelby Farms park
 Wolf River Conservancy

Parks in Memphis, Tennessee
Protected areas of Shelby County, Tennessee